The Edwardian Country House is a British historical reenactment reality television miniseries produced by Channel 4. First aired weekly in the UK beginning in April 2002, it was later broadcast in the United States on PBS stations  as Manor House in 2003, where extra footage was added. It is third in a series of historical reality shows produced by Channel 4, preceded by The 1900 House and The 1940s House.

Synopsis
In the series the Olliff-Cooper family are given the identities of turn-of-the-century aristocrats and housed in Manderston, an opulent Scottish country house, where they live for three months in the Edwardian style. Mr. and Dr Olliff-Cooper become Sir John Olliff-Cooper and Lady Olliff-Cooper.

Interest and conflict is provided by the 15 servants, portrayed by individuals from several paths of life. Chief among these was Hugh Edgar, an architect from Surrey, who was cast in the role of the butler.

Participants received instruction and a set of rules by which they were expected to abide for the duration of the experiment. Most of the "upstairs" participants enjoy their time in the house, which is meant to represent the years 1905–1914. Those "below stairs" have a different experience; for those in the lowest ranks, particularly the successive scullery maids, life appears to be intolerable.

Cast
The narrator is Derek Jacobi.

Upstairs

Downstairs

Senior Staff

Junior staff

Episodes

Home media
This VHS and DVD were released 27 May 2003 from PBS Home Video.

References

External links

 The Edwardian Country House at Acorn TV (Streaming available)

2002 British television series debuts
2002 British television series endings
2000s British reality television series
Channel 4 reality television shows
Historical reality television series
Films shot in the Scottish Borders
Television series by Warner Bros. Television Studios
English-language television shows
Works set in country houses